Malacoctenus zacae, the Zaca blenny, is a species of labrisomid blenny native to the Pacific coast of Mexico from Baja California to Acapulco.  This species can reach a length of  TL.

References

zacae
Fish of Mexican Pacific coast
Fish described in 1959
Taxa named by Victor G. Springer